İbrahim Çiftçi (born 1 December 1997) is a Turkish freestyle wrestler, competing in the 97 kg division. He is a member of Ankara Aski Spor Club.

Career 

In 2017, he won the bronze medal in the men's freestyle 97 kg event at the 2017 World Juniors Wrestling Championships held in Tampere, Finland.

In 2019, he won the gold medal in the men's 97 kg event at the 2019 European U23 Wrestling Championship held in Novi Sad, Serbia.

References

External links
 

1997 births
Living people
Turkish male sport wrestlers